Sanghyeon Station is a metro station located in Sanghyeon-dong, Suji-gu, Yongin, Gyeonggi-do, South Korea. The station's floors are decorated with LCD screens displaying water ripples and fish that interact with people's footsteps, symbolic of the popular Gwanggyo lake park that is located 10 minutes by foot from this station.

Many shops, restaurants, clinics, banks and commercial buildings surround this station, which is part of the Gwanggyo new city.

References

Seoul Metropolitan Subway stations
Metro stations in Yongin
Railway stations opened in 2016